Freddie Wong (born September 13, 1985) is an American Internet celebrity, filmmaker, VFX artist, podcaster, and competitive gamer. Wong has participated in at least three YouTube channels; with RocketJump, his production company's main channel, supporting over 9 million subscribers; BrandonJLa, a channel including behind the scenes videos and other content, which holds over 1.1 million subscribers; and Node, a gaming channel with over 3.2 million subscribers. He is also known for creating the web series Video Game High School.

Early life
Wong attended Lakeside School in Seattle, Washington. He then attended and graduated from the University of Southern California School of Cinematic Arts. Wong owns and manages Overcrank Media, a Los Angeles-based media production company specializing in feature film and online video content, having produced an independent film titled Bear. Wong met his future collaborator Brandon Laatsch in college.

Career

2006–2010: Competitive gaming, YouTube breakthrough 
Wong launched a YouTube channel in 2006, initially uploading gameplay footage to wide success, and competed in the World Series of Video Games in Dallas in July 2007. He won first prize in the Guitar Hero 2 competition, playing the song "Less Talk More Rokk" by Freezepop. It was around this time that he began uploading videos to YouTube and finding popularity with his comedic or video game-related content.

During MTV's "Gamer's Week" celebration in November 2007, Freddie appeared as a guest on Total Request Live. Participating in the program with his newly formed band Hellanor Brozevelt, Wong was part of a country-wide search to find the best Rock Band ensemble. After receiving tutelage from well-known rockers Good Charlotte, Brozevelt performed at the Hard Rock Cafe in New York against Chicago-based Carrie Me Home.

Wong's videos would sometimes feature celebrity cameos, with Jimmy Kimmel in a bathroom tie battle, Andy Whitfield appearing in a Time Crisis tribute video, Kevin Pollak appearing in a Hypnotism stunt, Shenae Grimes in a romantic gun action scene, Ray William Johnson in a troll infestation video, Eliza Dushku appearing in an action scene, Jon Favreau featuring in his video based on Cowboys & Aliens, the glam metal band Steel Panther appearing in his video based on the Crossfire board game, and Smosh appearing in his video "Huge Guns (with Smosh)".

In 2010, Wong helped Joe Penna, known as MysteryGuitarMan on YouTube, shoot a commercial for McDonald's, and assisted Wong Fu Productions in actions scenes of Agents of Secret Stuff. In 2011 Wong produced, co-directed, and acted in a TV commercial for Battlefield 3 at the request of Electronic Arts.

2011–17: RocketJump shorts and Video Game High School 
In 2011, along with his partners Matt Arnold and Desmond "Dez" Dolly, Wong formed the production company RocketJump. They began work on the web series Video Game High School, which began releasing episodes on May 11, 2012, achieved over 100 million views across various online platforms. The series was based on a concept by Will Campos and Chris Pappavaselio. The team was able to raise funding for the series through Kickstarter, where they set a funding goal for $75,000 to be raised in a 30-day period. That amount was quickly pledged in less than 24 hours and continued to climb from there. On October 22, 2011, pledging came to a close, with $273,725 raised for the project from 5,661 backers. The series ran for three seasons, with the final season having a crowd funded budget of over $2.4 million. The final episode of the series was released November 17, 2014, on the RocketJump website and YouTube.

In late 2013, Wong's channel, freddiew was renamed to "Rocketjump", and freddiew2 was renamed to "BrandonJLa". Brandon Laatsch also announced that he and Wong would no longer work together on projects, and any short videos or "shorts" would be posted on either NODE (a gaming channel run by Laatsch and Corridor Digital's Niko Pueringer and Sam Gorski) or BrandonJLa. This was done because they wanted to work on separate projects, as Wong was busy with Video Game High School, and Brandon started working on a VR engine and game Boneworks.

In 2017, Wong announced that RocketJump would be pivoting away from regular shorts, in favour of other projects. RocketJump stopped uploading videos altogether in 2018, after the second season of Anime Crimes Division.

2017–present: Podcasting and feature film 

From April 2017 to October 2021, Wong co-hosted the podcast Story Break on the Maximum Fun network. As described on the RocketJump website, the show features "[co-hosts] Will Campos, Matt Arnold, and Freddie Wong sit[ting] down in the RocketJump writer's room and attempt[ing] to 'break' a story for a ridiculous concept, property, or idea that [they] in NO way have any rights to." The podcast concluded in 2021, both due to the hosts feeling creatively satisfied with the show and to allow them more time to work on upcoming projects.

Since January 2019 Wong has been a collaborator on a Dungeons & Dragons actual play podcast called Dungeons and Daddies, along with Will Campos, Anthony Burch, Matt Arnold, and Beth May. The podcast is about four dads from Earth that are transported to the Forgotten Realms (one of the official settings for Dungeons and Dragons Fifth Edition) and go on a quest to search for their lost sons. Wong edits the show and is one of the four players, with Burch as the Dungeon Master.

On October 21, 2021, RocketJump revealed on Facebook that they're beginning work on their first feature film. Shooting took place in late 2021 in Southern California and Utah.

Personal life 
Wong is the older brother of actor and YouTuber Jimmy Wong, who co-starred in Video Game High School. His father is Chinese, from Canton, and his mother is of Chinese and Mongol ancestry. His uncle is Corey Yuen, a film director and stunt choreographer.

Filmography

References

Further reading

External links

1985 births
American esports players
Guitar Hero players
American film directors of Chinese descent
American musicians of Chinese descent
American people of Mongolian descent
Place of birth missing (living people)
Lakeside School alumni
Living people
Filmmakers from Seattle
USC School of Cinematic Arts alumni
American YouTubers
Film producers from Washington (state)